Wisconsin Coach Lines is a commuter bus service, charter coach service and intercity carrier based in Waukesha, Wisconsin. WCL was founded in 1941 as Waukesha Transit Lines. It has been a subsidiary of Coach USA since 1998.

Overview 
Airport Express operates 15 times daily to O'Hare Airport (ORD), and  Mitchell Airport (MKE) from Waukesha, Milwaukee, Racine, and Kenosha.

Within Wisconsin WCL operates one daily bus route between Milwaukee, Racine, and Kenosha under contract from Racine and Kenosha counties, and 4 commuter routes between Waukesha County and downtown Milwaukee as a subcontractor to Waukesha Metro Transit, which manages routes for Waukesha County. WCL operates bi-weekly service between Milwaukee and University of Wisconsin-Whitewater, under contract from the school.

WCL also provides private charter bus service throughout the United States and Canada.

Route detail 
Wisconsin Coach Lines operates 8 fixed route services within southeast Wisconsin, listed below. Not included are Dairyland Bus services.

See also
 List of intercity bus stops in Wisconsin
 List of intercity bus stops in Illinois

References

External links
 Wisconsin Coach Lines website

Stagecoach Group bus operators in the United States and Canada
Bus transportation in Wisconsin
Intercity bus companies of the United States
Transport companies established in 1941
School bus operators
Transportation in Waukesha County, Wisconsin
1941 establishments in Wisconsin
Airport bus services
Transportation companies based in Wisconsin